The Cerna is a right tributary of the river Crasna in Romania. It discharges into the Crasna near Supur.

References

Rivers of Romania
Rivers of Satu Mare County
Rivers of Maramureș County